Marionina is a genus of annelids belonging to the family Enchytraeidae.

The genus has cosmopolitan distribution.

Species:
 Marionina aberrans Finogenova, 1973 
 Marionina achaeta (Hagen, 1954)

References

Annelids